Çorum District (also: Merkez, meaning "central") is a district of the Çorum Province of Turkey. Its seat is the city of Çorum. Its area is 2,436 km2, and its population is 299,061 (2022).

Composition
There are two municipalities in Çorum District:
 Çorum
 Düvenci

There are 198 villages in Çorum District:

 Abdalata
 Acıpınar
 Ahiilyas
 Ahmediye
 Ahmetoğlan
 Akçakaya
 Aksungur
 Akyazı
 Altınbaş
 Arpalık
 Arpaöz
 Arslanköy
 Aşağısaraylı
 Atçalı
 Ayaz
 Ayvalı
 Babaoğlu
 Balıyakup
 Balumsultan
 Bektaşoğlu
 Beydili
 Boğabağı
 Boğacık
 Boğazönü
 Bozboğa
 Budakören
 Burunköy
 Büğdüz
 Büğet
 Büğrüoğlu
 Büyükdivan
 Büyükgülücek
 Çağşak
 Çakır
 Çalıca
 Çalkışla
 Çaltıcak
 Çalyayla
 Çanakçı
 Çatak
 Çayhatap
 Celilkırı
 Cerit
 Çeşmeören
 Çıkrık
 Çobandivan
 Çomarbaşı
 Çorak
 Çukurören
 Dağkarapınar
 Değirmendere
 Delibekiroğlu
 Deliler
 Denizköy
 Dereköy
 Dutçakallı
 Dutköy
 Düdüklük
 Elicek
 Elköy
 Elmalı
 Erdek
 Ertuğrul
 Esençay
 Eskice
 Eskiekin
 Eskikaradona
 Eskiköy
 Eskiören
 Evcikuzkışla
 Evciortakışla
 Evciyenikışla
 Eyerci
 Eymir
 Feruz
 Gemet
 Göcenovacığı
 Gökçepınar
 Gökdere
 Gökköy
 Güney
 Güveçli
 Güvenli
 Güzelyurt
 Hacıahmetderesi
 Hacıbey
 Hacımusa
 Hacıpaşa
 Hamamlıçay
 Hamdiköy
 Hankozlusu
 Harmancık
 Hımıroğlu
 Hızırdede
 İğdeli
 İnalözü
 İsmailköy
 Kadıderesi
 Kadıkırı
 Kalehisar
 Karaağaç
 Karabayır
 Karabürçek
 Karaca
 Karacaören
 Karadona
 Karagöz
 Karahisar
 Karakeçili
 Karapınar
 Kavacık
 Kayı
 Kazıklıkaya
 Kertme
 Kılıçören
 Kınık
 Kınıkdeliler
 Kiranlık
 Kirazlıpınar
 Kireçocağı
 Kırkdilim
 Kızılpınar
 Konaklı
 Koparan
 Köprüalan
 Kozluca
 Küçükdüvenci
 Küçükgülücek
 Küçükpalabıyık
 Kumçeltiği
 Kuruçay
 Kuşsaray
 Kutluca
 Laloğlu
 Mecidiyekavak
 Mislerovacığı
 Mollahasan
 Morsümbül
 Mühürler
 Mustafaçelebi
 Narlık
 Öksüzler
 Ömerbey
 Örencik
 Osmaniye
 Ovasaray
 Oymaağaç
 Palabıyık
 Pancarlık
 Paşaköy
 Pembecik
 Pınarçay
 Pınarcık
 Şahinkaya
 Salur
 Şanlıosman
 Sapa
 Saraylı
 Sarıkaya
 Sarılık
 Sarımbey
 Sarışeyh
 Sarmaşa
 Sazak
 Sazdeğirmeni
 Şekerbey
 Şendere
 Serban
 Serpin
 Sevindikalanı
 Seydim
 Seydimçakallı
 Seyfe
 Şeyhhamza
 Şeyhmustafa
 Sırıklı
 Soğuksu
 Tarhan
 Tarhankozlusu
 Taşpınar
 Tatar
 Teslim
 Tolamehmet
 Tozluburun
 Turgut
 Türkayşe
 Türkler
 Üçköy
 Uğrak
 Ülkenpınarı
 Üyük
 Yakuparpa
 Yaydiğin
 Yenice
 Yenihayat
 Yeşildere
 Yeşilyayla
 Yoğunpelit

References

Districts of Çorum Province